Alex Clark is an American comedian, animator, YouTuber, and juggler based in Los Angeles, California. His YouTube channel, itsAlexClark, features humorous animated videos depicting moments from his life, documentaries about his road trips, and many other types of videos.

As a YouTuber, he is partnered with Studio71, and his channel was nominated for a Streamy Award for best animated YouTube channel. He is also known for his career as a live street performer, whose acts combine comedy and juggling.

A graduate of Emerson College, he was trained by the Groundlings and Cirque du Soleil. His comedic juggling act led to him being named the Hot Variety Act of 2014 by Campus Activities Magazine. In March 2018, a video he made explaining gun control by analogy to cats attracted media attention. The video was made shortly before – and included a link to – the March for Our Lives later that month.

In June 2018, he was one of several YouTube celebrities to be featured in the BroadbandTV video game Squad Rivals. On May 26, 2020, Alex launched a kickstarter campaign for a tabletop card game called Sugar Heist.  This was done in collaboration with Zach Craley and Studio 71 Games.  The game was fully funded in 40 minutes and went on to raise $138,000 dollars.

Notes

References

External links

American YouTubers
Living people
American animators
Jugglers
American street performers
Emerson College alumni
1985 births
YouTube animators
Comedy YouTubers
YouTube channels launched in 2009